The following squads were named for the 1964 Summer Olympics tournament.

Argentina 

Head coach:  Ernesto Duchini

Brazil 

Head coach: Vicente Feola

Czechoslovakia 

Head coach: Rudolf Vytlačil

United Team of Germany

Head coach:  Károly Sós

United Arab Republic 

Head coach:  Josef Vandler

Ghana 

Head coach: Charles Gyamfi

Hungary 

Head coach: Lajos Baróti

Iran 

Head coach: Hossein Fekri

Japan 

Head coach:  Dettmar Cramer

South Korea 

Head coach: Chung Kook-chin

Mexico 

Head coach: Ignacio Trelles

Morocco 

Head coach: Mohamed Massoun

Romania 

Head coach: Silviu Ploeșteanu

Yugoslavia 

Head coach: Ljubomir Lovrić

References

External links
 FIFA
 RSSSF

Squads
1964 Summer Olympics